Cantharidella rottnestensis is a species of sea snail, a marine gastropod mollusk in the family Trochidae, the top snails.

Description
The size of the shell attains 2 mm.

Distribution
This marine species is endemic to Australia and occurs off Western Australia.

References

 Wilson, B. 1993. Australian Marine Shells. Prosobranch Gastropods. Kallaroo, Western Australia : Odyssey Publishing Vol. 1 408 pp.

External links
 To World Register of Marine Species

rottnestensis
Gastropods of Australia
Gastropods described in 1911